Al Mirqab Mall is a shopping mall on the Al Jadeed street, neighborhoods Al Sadd in Doha, Qatar. The mall has over 500 stores and service outlets selling goods including clothes, shoes, cosmetics, jewelry, textiles, handicrafts and musical instruments.

References

External links
 Al Mirqab Mall website

Shopping malls established in 2016
Shopping malls in Doha